Cornelius Cardew (7 May 193613 December 1981) was an English experimental music composer, and founder (with Howard Skempton and Michael Parsons) of the Scratch Orchestra, an experimental performing ensemble. He later rejected experimental music, explaining why he had "discontinued composing in an avantgarde idiom" in his own programme notes to his Piano Album 1973.

Biography
Cardew was born in Winchcombe, Gloucestershire. He was the second of three sons whose parents were both artists—his father was the potter Michael Cardew. The family moved to Wenford Bridge Pottery Cornwall a few years after his birth where he was first nurtured as a chorister at Canterbury Cathedral, and later at The King's School, Canterbury which had evacuated to the Carlyon Bay Hotel for the war. His musical career thus began as a chorister. From 1953 to 1957, Cardew studied piano, cello, and composition at the Royal Academy of Music in London.

Career
Having won a scholarship to study at the recently established Studio for Electronic Music in Cologne, Cardew served as an assistant to Karlheinz Stockhausen from 1958 to 1960. He was given the task of independently working out the composition plans for the German composer's score Carré, and Stockhausen noted:

As a musician he was outstanding because he was not only a good pianist but also a good improviser and I hired him to become my assistant in the late 50s and he worked with me for over three years. I gave him work to do which I have never given to any other musician, which means to work with me on the score I was composing. He was one of the best examples that you can find among musicians because he was well informed about the latest theories of composition as well as being a performer.

Indeterminacy and American experimentalists
In 1958, Cardew witnessed a series of concerts in Cologne by John Cage and David Tudor which had a considerable influence on him, leading him to abandon post-Schönbergian serial composition and develop the indeterminate and experimental scores for which he is best known. He was particularly prominent in introducing the works of American experimental composers such as Morton Feldman, La Monte Young, Earle Brown, Christian Wolff, and Cage to an English audience during the early to mid sixties and came to have a considerable impact on the development of English music from the late sixties onwards.

Cardew's most important scores from his experimental period are Treatise (1963–67), a 193-page graphic score which allows for considerable freedom of interpretation, and The Great Learning, a work in seven parts or "Paragraphs," based on translations of Confucius by Ezra Pound. The Great Learning instigated the formation of the Scratch Orchestra. During those years, he took a course in graphic design and he made his living as a graphic designer at Aldus Books in London.

In 1966, Cardew joined the free improvisation group AMM as cellist and pianist. AMM had formed the previous year and included English jazz musicians Lou Gare, Eddie Prévost, Keith Rowe, and one of his first students at the Royal Academy Christopher Hobbs. Performing with the group allowed Cardew to explore music in a completely democratic environment, freely improvising without recourse to scores.

While teaching an experimental music class at London's Morley College in 1968, Cardew, along with Howard Skempton and Michael Parsons formed the Scratch Orchestra, a large experimental ensemble, initially for the purposes of interpreting Cardew's The Great Learning. The Scratch Orchestra gave performances throughout Britain and elsewhere until its demise in 1972. It was during this period that the question of art for whom was hotly debated within the context of the Orchestra, which Cardew came to see as elitist despite its numerous attempts to make socially accessible music.

Political involvements
Cardew became a member of the Communist Party of England (Marxist-Leninist) in the 1970s, and in 1979 was a co-founder and member of the Central Committee of the Revolutionary Communist Party of Britain (Marxist-Leninist). His creative output from the demise of the Scratch Orchestra until his death reflected his political commitment.

At a meeting of the Central London branch of the Musicians Union, he tabled a controversial motion denouncing David Bowie as a fascist, after Bowie said that "Britain was ready for a fascist leader" (Though Bowie’s remarks were intended as a warning).The motion read:

Although the vote was a tie, At twelve for and twelve against, a second motion was passed with a majority of 15–2. At the time of the punk explosion, he wrote a tract called "Punk Rock Is Fascist", where he called The Clash "reactionary".

Legacy
Tony Harris (2013) argues that Cardew's inclusion in Wikipedia or in other encyclopedias such as New Grove has the effect of taming his legacy as a composer and ignoring those aspects of his work other than those which fit with those of a contributor to the Western classical music canon. In other terms, it fails to "define his attitude or approach to music making and (makes) no attempt to illustrate his influence or impact...Composers, if they are to be remembered and valued within the Western classical context, must leave behind masterworks" to justify their being encyclopedized in a format whose guidelines implicitly dictate "what a composer biography should look like".

Death
Cardew died on 13 December 1981 aged 45, the victim of a hit-and-run car accident near his London home in Leyton. The driver was never found.

Musician John Tilbury, in his book Cornelius Cardew—A Life Unfinished suggests that the possibility that Cardew was killed because of his prominent Marxist-Leninist involvement "cannot be ruled out". Tilbury quotes a friend of Cardew's, John Maharg; "MI5 are quite ruthless; people don't realise it. And they kill pre-emptively". However, Howard Skempton recalled the treacherous weather conditions prevailing at the time of Cardew's death and suggests that Cardew could have been walking in the road to avoid the icy pavements and might have been hit by a drunken driver who drove off to avoid arrest.

A 70th Birthday Anniversary Festival, including live music from all phases of Cardew's career and a symposium on his music, took place on 7 May 2006 at the Cecil Sharp House in London.

In popular culture
In 1999, Page 183 of Cardew's Treatise was performed by the experimental rock group Sonic Youth on their album SYR4: Goodbye 20th Century.
"Cornelius Cardew" is the name of the unemployed pipe-fitter in Alan Moore's Skizz.
A character called "Cornelius Cardew" appears (as a caricature of a political radical) in the 1980 novel The Shooting Party.
The German musician and composer Ekkehard Ehlers published a Cardew-inspired work in 2001, titled Ekkehard Ehlers plays Cornelius Cardew, which was released on Staubgold Records.
The US band The Music Lovers name-checked Cardew in the song, "Thank You, Cornelius Cardew". It appears on their 2006 album, The Music Lovers' Guide for Young People.

Discography
 The Great Learning (Deutsche Grammophon, 1971)
 Four Principles on Ireland and Other Pieces 1974 (Cramps, 1975)
 Memorial Concert (Impetus, 1985)
 Thälmann Variations (Matchless, 1986)
 Piano Music (B&L, 1991)
 Piano Music 1959–70 (Matchless, 1996)
 Treatise (hatART, 1999)
 We Only Want the Earth (Musicnow, 2001)
 Apartment House Chamber Music 1955–64 (Matchless, 2001)
 We Sing for the Future! (New Albion, 2001)
 Material (hatART, 2004)
 Consciously (Musicnow, 2006)
 Treatise with Keith Rowe (Planam, 2009)
 Treatise with Petr Kotik (Mode, 2009)
 Works 1960–70 (+3 dB, 2010)
 Treatise (Harsh-Noise Version) (Sublime Recapitulation, 2013)

References

Further reading
 Aharonián, Coriún. "Cardew as a Basis for a Discussion on Ethical Options". Leonardo Music Journal 11 (2001): 13–15.
 Anderson, Virginia. "Chinese Characters and Experimental Structure in Cornelius Cardew's The Great Learning" Journal of Experimental Music Studies (uploaded 17 March 2004).
 Anderson, Virginia. "Cornelius Cardew Lives". OpenDemocracy (5 May 2006).
 Bains, Hardial. "The Question Is Really One of Word and Deed" (unpublished speech delivered 21 December 1996, as part of the seminar, "In Commemoration of Cornelius Cardew, 1936–1981", organised by the Progressive Cultural Association)
 Cardew, Cornelius. Cornelius Cardew: A Reader, edited by Edwin Prévost, introduction by Michael Parsons. Harlow, Essex: Copula, 2006. . (A collection of Cornelius Cardew's published writings together with commentaries and responses from Richard Barrett, Christopher Fox, Brian Dennis, Anton Lukoszevieze, Michael Nyman, Eddie Prévost, David Ryan, Howard Skempton, Dave Smith, John Tilbury and Christian Wolff.)
 Cardew, Cornelius, ed. Scratch Music . (Scratch Orchestra draft constitution, notes, scores, catalogue, and 1001 Activities.)
 Clark, Philip. "Cornelius Cardew: Schematic for the People". The Wire (November 2009): 30–33.
 Eno, Brian. "Generating and Organizing Variety in the Arts". In Audio Culture: Readings in Modern Music, edited by Christoph Cox and Daniel Warner, 226–33. New York and London: Continuum Books, 2004.  (A study of "Paragraph 7" of The Great Learning.)
 Fox, Edward. "Death of a Dissident". The Independent Magazine (9 May 1992): 24–30.
 Harris, Tony. The legacy of Cornelius Cardew. Abingdon, Ashgate 2013. .
 Marko, Vladimir.  [Cornelius Cardew—From Ludwig Wittgenstein to Mao Tse-Tung]. Scena: časopis za pozorišnu umetnost no. 4, 2006.
 McKay, George. Circular Breathing: The Cultural Politics of Jazz in Britain. Durham NC: Duke University Press, 2005. Chapter 4: 'The politics and performance of improvisation and contemporary jazz in the 1960s and 1970s'.
 Nyman, Michael. Experimental Music: Cage and Beyond. Cambridge: Cambridge University Press, 1999.
 Parsons, Michael. "The Scratch Orchestra and the Visual Arts". Leonardo Music Journal 11 (2001): 5–11.
 Schonfield, Victor. "Cornelius Cardew, AMM, and the Path to Perfect Hearing". Jazz Monthly 159 (May 1968): 10–11..
 Taylor, Timothy D. "Moving in Decency: The Music and Radical Politics of Cornelius Cardew" Music & Letters 79, no.4 (November 1998): 555–76.
 Tilbury, John. "Cornelius Cardew" Contact no. 26 (Spring 1983): 4–12
 Tilbury, John. "The Experimental Years: A View from the Left" Contact 22 (1981): 16–21. Reprinted online in Journal of Experimental Music Studies (17 March 2004).
 Tilbury, John. Cornelius Cardew: A Life Unfinished. Harlow: Copula, an imprint of Matchless Recordings and Publishing, 2008.  (cloth),  (pbk)
 Varela, Daniel. "'A Question of Language': Frederic Rzewski in conversation about Cornelius Cardew" Journal of Experimental Music Studies.

External links
Cornelius Cardew on British Composers Project 
Information and CD of Peoples Liberation Music
UbuWEB Historical: Cornelius Cardew (includes PDF of Stockhausen Serves Imperialism and commentary by Kyle Gann.)
Cornelius Cardew on Matchless Recordings Includes the Cornelius Cardew Reader, and recordings with AMM and of his piano works by John Tilbury
UbuWEB: Cornelius Cardew Cornelius Cardew Memorial Concert (1985)
UbuWEB Papers: Toward an Ethic of Improvisation by Cornelius Cardew (1971)
An online animated analysis of Treatise at the Block Museum Website
Online recordings of Treatise by the Seattle Improv Meeting
Online recordings of "Treatise" by Matt Smiley
 (January 2007) at Belsona Strategic record label site
Cornelius Cardew et la liberté de l'écoute: exhibition and concert series presented at CAC Brétigny (France) curated by Jean Jacques Palix and Dean Inkster (2009)
Piano Music of the 1970s at UbuWeb
"Cornelius Cardew: Works 1960–70" Recorded by John Tilbury, Michael Francis Duch and Rhodri Davies
https://www.youtube.com/watch?v=qcRQQ2i89Q8

1936 births
1981 deaths
20th-century classical composers
Anti-revisionists
English communists
English experimental musicians
English classical composers
Experimental composers
Maoists
Deutsche Grammophon artists
Music in Gloucestershire
Musicians from Gloucestershire
Road incident deaths in London
Pedestrian road incident deaths
People educated at The King's School, Canterbury
People from Winchcombe
Pupils of Karlheinz Stockhausen
20th-century English musicians
Political music artists
20th-century British composers